Saint-David-de-Falardeau is a municipality in Quebec, Canada.

References

L'endroit ou Gilles et Jonathan Tremblay sont nés

External links

Municipalities in Quebec
Incorporated places in Saguenay–Lac-Saint-Jean